Dilip Buwa (born Dilip Kohok; 1966 — 16 November 1991) was a notorious Indian gangster who used to work for the D-Company, an international crime syndicate of the Mumbai underworld led by Dawood Ibrahim. He was one of the men who were killed in 1991 by an encounter during the Lokhandwala Complex shootout. Buwa was killed by then Additional Police Commissioner of Mumbai, A. A. Khan.

Buwa was portrayed by Tusshar Kapoor in the Bollywood film Shootout at Lokhandwala (2007).

The director of the movie, Apoorva Lakhia, stated in an interview that Buwa once shot two girls at a bus stand in Bhandup, just because they were laughing at him.

Buwa was the bodyguard of Ramabhai Naik, another 
famous gangster in central Bombay. He was paid off by Chhota Rajan, a former  associate of Ibrahim. While visiting Chembur, Buwa turned and shot Naik dead. He then switched sides to the D-gang. Conversely, Maya Dolas was a member of a gang led by Arun Gawli. In an agreement between Amar Naik and Arun Gawli, they agreed to settle their disputes, but in return Amar wanted Dolas dead. When Dolas found out, he escaped and joined with Buwa and the D-company.

References

1966 births
1991 deaths
Indian gangsters
Indian gangsters killed in encounters
D-Company
1991 Lokhandwala Complex shootout
Criminals from Mumbai